Cymbulioidea is a taxonomic superfamily of pelagic "sea butterflies", one group of swimming sea snails. They are holoplanktonic opisthobranch gastropod molluscs in the clade Thecosomata.

Anatomy
Some groups within this superfamily possess a shell in the adult stage, some are without a shell in the adult stage, and others have developed a relatively tough gelatinous, cartilaginous internal structure, a sort of fake shell called the pseudoconch.

The lateral and posterior foot lobes are joined as a ciliated proboscis that leads to the mouth, and the wings are united ventrally to form a single plate.

A more general description is given under the entry sea butterfly.

Taxonomy 

The group was originally referred to as the Pseudothecosomata Meisenheimer, 1905, although this name is invalid under the ICZN and thus is no longer recognized. Instead its three families are categorized within the superfamily Cymbulioidea, which is itself part of the clade Thecosomata.

The superfamily Cymbulioidea consists of three following families (according to the taxonomy of the Gastropoda by Bouchet & Rocroi, 2005):

Family Peraclidae C. W. Johnson, 1915
Genus Peracle Forbes, 1844
Family Cymbuliidae J.E. Gray, 1840
Genus Corolla Dall, 1871
Genus Cymbulia Peron & Lesueur, 1810
Genus Gleba Forsskål, 1776
Family Desmopteridae (Dall, 1921)
Genus Desmopterus Chun, 1889

References

Further reading 
 Lalli C. M. & Gilmer R. W. (1989) Pelagic Snails. The biology of holoplanktonic gastropod molluscs. Stanford University Press: Stanford, California.

Euopisthobranchia
Taxa named by John Edward Gray